The Meuse-Argonne American Cemetery is a  World War I cemetery in France. It is located east of the village of Romagne-sous-Montfaucon in Meuse. The cemetery contains the largest number of American military dead in Europe (14,246), most of whom lost their lives during the Meuse-Argonne Offensive and were buried there.  The cemetery consists of eight sections behind a large central reflection pool.  Beyond the grave sections is a chapel which is decorated with stained glass windows depicting American units' insignias. Along the walls of the chapel area are the tablets of the missing which include the names of those soldiers who fought in the region and in northern Russia, but have no known grave. It also includes the Meuse-Argonne American Memorial. This cemetery is maintained by the American Battle Monuments Commission. It is open daily to the public from 9:00 a.m. to 5:00 p.m. The cemetery is closed January 1 and December 25, but is open on all other holidays.

Notable burials
 Medal of Honor recipients
 Second Lieutenant Erwin R. Bleckley (1894–1918), for service near Binarville, France
 Captain Marcellus H. Chiles (1895–1918), for action near Le Champy Bas, France
 Sergeant Matej Kocak (1882–1918), two-time recipient (Army and Navy medals)
 Second Lieutenant Frank Luke Jr. (1897–1918), the "Arizona Balloon Buster" and first airman to receive the medal of honor; Luke Air Force Base is named after him
 Major Oscar F. Miller (1882–1918), for his leadership in the Argonne
 Corporal Harold W. Roberts (1895–1918), for action in the Montrebeau Woods
 Sergeant William Sawelson (1895–1918), for action at Grandpré, Ardennes
 Lieutenant Colonel Fred E. Smith (1873–1918), for action near Binarville, France
 Corporal Freddie Stowers (1896–1918), for action in the Ardennes (medal awarded in 1991)
 Other notables
 Sergeant Victor E. Chapman (1890–1916), first American aviator to die in battle in the war
 Captain Edward L. Grant (1883–1918), pre-war professional baseball player

Gallery

See also
 List of World War I memorials and cemeteries in the Argonne
 Meuse-Argonne American Memorial
 Meuse-Argonne Offensive

References

Further reading

External links

 Official
 
 American Battle Monuments Commission (archived)
 General information
 Meuse-Argonne.wmv – Windows Media Video
 Cemetery booklet (no pictures)
 Cemetery booklet (with pictures)
 

 
1918 establishments in France
Aftermath of World War I in France
American Battle Monuments Commission
Buildings and structures in Meuse (department)
Cemeteries in Grand Est
History of Grand Est
Museums in Meuse (department)
Neoclassical architecture in France
Protected areas of France
Tourist attractions in Meuse (department)
World War I cemeteries in France